Karapurisvarar Temple is a Siva temple in Karapuram in Vellore district in Tamil Nadu (India).

Vaippu Sthalam
It is one of the shrines of the Vaippu Sthalams sung by Tamil Saivite Nayanar Appar.

Presiding deity
The presiding deity is known as Karapurisvarar. The Goddess is known as Abithagujalambal.

Location
This temple is located at Tirupparkkadal, also known as Karapuam, next to Kaverippakkam in Kancheepuram-Vellore road.

References

Hindu temples in Vellore district
Shiva temples in Vellore district